Leninaul (Pẋarçoşka) is a rural locality (a selo) in Kazbekovsky District, Republic of Dagestan, Russia. The population was 8,340 as of 2010. There are 94 streets.

Geography 
Leninaul is located on the left bank of the Aktash River, 9 km northwest of Dylym (the district's administrative centre) by road. Kalininaul and Dylym are the nearest rural localities.

Nationalities 
Avars and Chechens live there.

References 

Rural localities in Kazbekovsky District